Joondalup Drive is a major distributor road in the northern suburbs of Perth, Western Australia. The road travels through the City of Joondalup's central business district and extends for a few kilometres east through neighbouring residential suburbs in the City of Wanneroo. The road was extended in 2005 to the northern suburb of Banksia Grove to provide easy access for residents to Joondalup's city centre, and to provide a complete connecting route to the Brand Highway from the Mitchell Freeway.

The route from Ocean Reef Road to Burns Beach Road was gazetted as Road No. 10951 by the Shire of Wanneroo in 1953.

Route description
Joondalup Drive is part of State Route 85. The south-western terminus is Ocean Reef Road in Edgewater and the north-eastern terminus is Old Yanchep Road (formerly Pinjar Road) in Mariginiup, continuing eastwards as Neaves Road to Bullsbrook in the City of Swan. It is a four-lane dual carriageway for most of its length, reducing to a two-lane single carriageway for the remainder of its length east of Tumbleweed Drive and Joseph Banks Boulevard. The speed limit is mostly , though there is a short  section at the northern extent of the suburb of Joondalup.

City of Joondalup 
Joondalup Drive commences at a traffic light controlled T-junction at Ocean Reef Road in Edgewater in the City of Joondalup LGA, and then travels through said suburb for  before intersecting at Eddystone Avenue, heading over into Joondalup.  takes the road to Sundew Rise and Lakeside Drive, the latter of which acts as an outer ring road and suburban street within the Joondalup CBD. Grand Boulevard connects to Hodges Drive at its southern end and Moore Drive at its northern end. After the northern end of Lakeside Drive, Joondalup Drive runs through residential areas at the northern extent of Joondalup before reaching Burns Beach Road at a roundabout . About  further east, Joondalup Drive leaves the City of Joondalup LGA and heads over into the neighbouring City of Wanneroo.

City of Wanneroo 
Joondalup Drive travels briefly through the northern edge of Wanneroo, providing access to the Wanneroo Botanic Gardens and Mini Golf complex, before reaching a roundabout interchange with Wanneroo Road  further east. The road then travels through the residential suburbs of Carramar and Tapping for  before reaching a roundabout with Pinjar Road, after which the road is completely within Banksia Grove. The road, and State Route 85, continue east as Neaves Road towards Bullsbrook, and to Tonkin Highway and Great Northern Highway.

History

Early history 
Joondalup Drive was originally known as Osborne Drive, but was renamed in the late 1979 when the proposal to change its name was brought before Wanneroo Shire Council by the Joondalup Development Corporation.

2005 extension and duplication 
In the early months of 2005, construction of a major extension to Joondalup Drive was undertaken, extending from its then-northern terminus at Yandella Promenande, Tapping, to Neaves Road, Banksia Grove. The duplication and extension was necessitated mainly by the large traffic volumes that used the section of Joondalup Drive between Wanneroo Road and Hodges Drive during morning and evening peak hours, mainly caused by heavy traffic flows to and from the Mitchell Freeway at its then-northern terminus at Hodges Drive.

The extension was constructed as a two-lane single carriageway, expanding to a four-lane dual carriageway in the vicinity of a major roundabout with Pinjar Road. It then reduced back to a two-lane single carriageway for the remainder of the road before intersecting with Neaves Road. The construction of this extension also required the upgrade of Joondalup Drive from before Burns Beach Road beyond Wanneroo Road to before Millendon Street, Carramar.

The construction of the extension including associated works caused some significant issues, particularly given its involvement in two local governments (the City of Joondalup and the City of Wanneroo), a state government department (Main Roads Western Australia), one state government utility (Western Power), and one public utility (Alinta). This caused significant issues in synchronisation of works, with each group causing delays for the other as their work progressed. One of the main delays in construction of the Wanneroo Road duplication was the relocation of 225kVA high voltage power lines from the Tapping Substation that resided within the road reserve area that was needed for these works. Additionally, significant upgrade works were needed on the Burns Beach Road approaches to Joondalup Drive and the subsequent roundabout at this intersection that also required duplication.

The full works on this section were finally completed in 2006, some 18 months after they had commenced. During that time nearby Pinjar Road had been realigned, and State Route 86 was replaced by State Route 85 and Tourist Drive 359 (with the exception of Pinjar Road).

Subsequent works 
Joondalup Drive was turned into a dual carriageway from St Stephens Crescent to Tumbleweed Drive in 2011.

In 2018 work started on upgrading the intersection with Wanneroo Road to a roundabout interchange, with Joondalup Drive passing over a roundabout with Wanneroo Road. This work is expected to be completed by late-2020.

Major intersections

  Ocean Reef Road (State Route 84),  and  – to Ocean Reef, Wangara and Ellenbrook.
 Eddystone Avenue,  and Edgewater – to 
 Hodges Drive west / Grand Boulevard east, Joondalup – to Heathridge, Connolly
 Shenton Avenue, Joondalup – to Connolly, Currambine, Iluka, Ocean Reef
 Moore Drive west / Grand Boulevard east, Joondalup – to Currambine
  Burns Beach Road (State Route 87), Joondalup – to Currambine, Kinross, Burns Beach, Iluka
  Wanneroo Road - Wanneroo, Neerabup, Tapping, and Carramar – to 
 Pinjar Road - Banksia Grove, Tapping, and Carramar – to Ashby, Mariginiup
  Neaves Road east / Old Yanchep Road north, Banksia Grove, Mariginiup, and  – to

See also

References

Roads in Perth, Western Australia
Joondalup
Articles containing video clips